The 2022–23 Essex Senior Football League season is the 52nd in the history of the Essex Senior Football League, a football competition in England.

The proposed constitution for this season was published on 15 May 2022, based on allocations for Steps 5 and 6 announced by the FA three days earlier, and is subject to appeals.

Essex Senior League
At the end of the 2021–22 season, the following teams left the league:

Promoted to the Southern League Division One Central
 Walthamstow

Relegated to the Eastern Senior League
 Sporting Bengal United
 St Margaretsbury

Transferred within Step 5, to the Spartan South Midlands League
 Cockfosters
 Hoddesdon Town

The remaining 16 teams, together with the following, form the Essex Senior League for 2022–23:

Promoted from the Eastern Senior League
 Buckhurst Hill
 Halstead Town

Relegated from the Isthmian League North Division
 Barking
 Romford

League table
Prior to the first match(es) being played the Pos column shows alphabetic sequence of teams rather than league position.

Stadia and locations

References

2022-23
9